Abkhazians of African descent or Afro-Abkhazians, also known as African Caucasians, were a small group of people of African descent in Abkhazia, who used to live mainly in the settlement Adzyubzha at the mouth of the Kodori River and the surrounding villages (Chlou, Pokvesh, Agdarra and Merkulov) on the eastern coast of the Black Sea.

Origin

Hypotheses
The ethnic origin of the Afro-Abkhazians—and how Africans arrived in Abkhazia—is still a matter of dispute among experts. Historians agree that the settlement of Africans in a number of villages in the village of Adzyubzha in Abkhazia (then part of the Ottoman Empire) is likely to have happened in the 17th century. According to one version, a few hundred slaves were bought and brought by Shervashidze princes (Chachba) to work on the citrus plantations. This case was a unique, and apparently not entirely successful, instance of mass import of Africans to the Black Sea coast.

It has also been hypothesized that Afro-Abkhazians are descendants of the ancient Colchians that Herodotus described as "dark-skinned and [having] woolly hair"; however, Herodotus' account has generally been discredited on the basis that no other anthropological or genetic evidence for an ancient Sub-Saharan African presence in the Caucasus has been found.

In 1927, the Russian writer Maxim Gorky, together with the Abkhaz writer Samson Chanba, visited the village of Adzyubzha and met elderly Africans there. They opined that the Ethiopian version of the origin of the Abkhazians of African descent is true since there are several parallels between the name of the villages in Ethiopia and in Afro-Abkhazian villages like Bagadi, Gunma and Dabakur.

Legends
There are a number of folk legends that are based on true events. According to one of them, which is mentioned in the memorandum of Ivan Isakov to Nikita Khrushchev, an Ottoman ship wrecked near the Abkhazian coast during a storm, with slaves who were brought up for sale, and the current Abkhazians of African descent are the descendants of survivors from the ship, who founded the colony in Abkhazia. This legend, however, does not explain how such a ship could have entered the waters of the Black Sea, which is so far from major shipping lanes of the slave trade of that time.

Another legend tells about the dealings of Narts with certain "black-faced people" from the Horn of Africa. The legendary Narts are said to have come back to the Caucasus from a long African campaign with hundreds of African escorts, who remained in Abkhazia.

In a third legend, the appearance of Afro-Abkhazians is involved with Peter the Great: he imported many black Africans to Russia, and it is said that those who were unable to acclimate to the northern capital of Russia, Saint Petersburg, were then generously given to the Abkhazian princes. According to the history candidate Igor Burtsev, there could have been a few dozen such "gifts of Peter" to Abkhazian princes.

History and present
The said memorandum of Ivan Isakov to Khrushchev on the Abkhazians of African descent says, among other things, that the governor of the Caucasus Illarion Vorontsov-Dashkov, imitating Peter the Great, had his personal convoy of Afro-Adzyubzhi, who accompanied him in Chokha. Prince Alexander of Oldenburg, founder of Gagra, kept in his court a few representatives from each of the peoples of the Black Sea coast of the Caucasus, including the local blacks.

It is known that by the 19th century, Afro-Abkhazians spoke only Abkhazian. Their total number is estimated by different observers in the range of "several families" to "several villages".

Afro-Abkhazians engaged in growing citrus, grapes, and corn, working in the coal mines of Tkvarchreli and enterprises of Sukhumi, working in knitting factories, etc. Like the Abkhaz people, the Abkhazians of African descent today also speak Russian. Many left Kodor to settle in other parts of Georgia and in neighbouring Russia, as well as other nearby countries.

In other parts of Caucasus 
A small number of Africans in the 19th and early 20th centuries also lived in the Adjarian city of Batumi.

The Library of Congress, in George Kennan's collection, has a picture of a Karabakhian African-Caucasian (1870–1886).

In popular culture
Afro-Abkhazians and their relationships with indigenous Abkhaz were featured in prose by Fazil Iskander.

See also

Afro-Russians
Afro-Turks
Black people
African diaspora
Abkhaz people
African admixture in Europe

Notes

References 

African diaspora in Europe
Ethnic groups in Abkhazia
History of Abkhazia
Sub-ethnic groups